County Road 915 is a  road in the municipality of Bø in Nordland County, Norway.

The road starts in the village of Rise, where it branches off from County Road 820, and then crosses the low isthmus to the village of Eidet, where County Road 917 branches off north towards the village of Grimstad. It then follows the sea to Sandvika, where it turns inland and runs along the west side of Bufjellet hill before descending to the village of Nykvåg, where County Road 916 branches off east to Vågen. The road then continues further along the water, past Malnes to the village of Hovden, where it terminates.

The road becomes very narrow below Tussen hill on the border of the Nyke/Tussen Nature Reserve before it reaches Hovden. This stretch of the road is also exposed to rockfalls and was closed by such a rockfall in 2014.

References

External links
Statens vegvesen – trafikkmeldinger Fv915 (Traffic Information: County Road 915)

915
Bø, Nordland